Vongchavalitkul University (VU) is a private university in Nakhon Ratchasima Province, Thailand. Founded in 1984 as Vongchavalitkul College, it was upgraded to university status in 1994. Currently the university offers 26 undergraduate degree programs, five master's degree programs, and four doctoral degree programs.

See also
 List of universities in Thailand

External links 
 

Buildings and structures in Nakhon Ratchasima
Private universities and colleges in Thailand
Educational institutions established in 1984
1984 establishments in Thailand